Harriett Elizabeth Ephrussi-Taylor (April 10, 1918 – March 30, 1968) was an American geneticist, microbiologist and educator, who initiated and made crucial contributions to the fields of transformation and bacterial recombination.

Biography

Born in Belmar, New Jersey, Harriett Taylor grew up and attended secondary school in Washington, D.C.. Following her interest in the natural sciences, she pursued her undergraduate studies at Radcliffe College in Cambridge, Massachusetts, which she completed cum laude in 1938. She then moved to the University of California, Los Angeles, where she studied zoology and obtained her master's degree in 1942.  During her doctoral studies in the laboratory of L. C. Dunn at Columbia University in New York, she investigated genetic mechanisms underlying the growth kinetics of yeast cultures and earned her PhD in 1945.

In 1945 she joined the laboratory of Oswald Avery at the Rockefeller Institute for Medical Research, where she began building a collection of mutant bacteria Streptococcus pneumoniae (pneumococcus) deficient in their ability to synthesize the cell wall. In her later studies, she identified that bacterial phenotypes are due to independent factors in the bacterial genome and factors in transforming DNA.

In 1947 Harriett started working with Boris Ephrussi, her future husband, in Paris before they moved to the French National Centre for Scientific Research in Gif-sur-Yvette in 1952. Between 1962 and 1967, the Ephrussis moved for a research stay to Cleveland.

In 1968, shortly after her return to France, Ephrussi-Taylor died after a short but serious illness at the peak of her scientific career.

Research

 
Ephrussi-Taylor investigated bacterial transformation at the stage of DNA recombination during which donor DNA inserts into the genome of the recipient bacterium. She established quantitative methods and contributed seminal work for the understanding of the genetic and molecular basis of transformation. They demonstrated the dependence of transformation on the size of transforming DNA  and that mutations could be chemically induced in DNA in vitro.

Ephrussi-Taylor collaborated and corresponded frequently with James Watson and Maurice Wilkins generating scientific hypothesis, sharing experimental protocols, discussing data interpretation and exchanging the latest findings from other researchers such as Macfarlane Burnet.

Personal life
Her father was Albert H. Taylor. In 1949, Harriett married Boris Ephrussi. Her daughter, Anne Ephrussi, was born in 1955.

Honors and awards
In 1964, Ephrussi-Taylor was elected member of American Academy of Arts and Sciences.

References 

1918 births
1968 deaths
20th-century biologists
American geneticists
American microbiologists
American zoologists
Radcliffe College alumni
University of California, Los Angeles alumni
People from Belmar, New Jersey
Scientists from New Jersey